Dave Burland (born 12 July 1941, Barnsley, West Riding of Yorkshire, England) is an English folk singer and guitarist. A former policeman, he has been performing in English folk clubs since 1968 and has been described by The Guardian as having a "uniquely relaxed singing style".

In 1976 Burland joined the folk group Hedgehog Pie, which disbanded in 1978. He re-formed the group in 2010, with Mick Doonan and Jed Grimes.

He provided additional vocals on the track "Wild Goose" on Kate Rusby's award-winning 1999 album Sleepless.

Discography

Solo albums
A Dalesman's Litany (LP), Leader Records (LER 2029), 1971; reissued as CD (LERCD2029), 1999 	
Dave Burland (LP), Trailer Records (LER 2082), 1972 	
Songs & Buttered Haycocks (LP), Rubber Records (RUB 012), 1975 
You Can't Fool The Fat Man (LP), Rubber Records (RUB 036), 1979 
Rollin''' (LP), Moonraker Music (MOO 6), 1980s (date unknown) 	Willin' (LP), Black Crow Records (CRO 223), 1989 	His Master's Choice – The Songs Of Richard Thompson (CD), The Road Goes On Forever (RGFCD 009), 1994 	Benchmark (CD), Fat Cat Records (FATCD004), 1996

With Tony Capstick and Dick GaughanSongs Of Ewan MacColl (LP), Rubber Records (RUB 027), 1978Songs Of Ewan MacColl (LP), Black Crow Records (CRO 215), 1978

With Hedgehog PieJust Act Normal (LP), Rubber Records (RUB 024), 1978Hedgehog Pie Live! (CD), Blue Guitar (BGCD023), 2003
 .  Okkard.  Fat cat (CD) The Awkward Squad, Dave Burland, Dave Fisher, Bryan Ledgard.

On compilation albums
 "William Taylor" on Voices – English Traditional Songs (CD), Fellside Recordings (ECD87), 1992
 "The Shape of A Girl" on Street Cries – A Collection Of Dark Traditional Songs Re-Set In The Present Day By Ashley Hutchings'' (CD), Topic Records (TSCD535), 2001

References

English folk singers
English folk guitarists
English male guitarists
People educated at Holgate School, Barnsley
Musicians from Barnsley
1941 births
Living people